Zsolt Dvéri (born 12 August 1976 in Hungary) is a Hungarian former footballer. He played in the Hungarian national football team.

External links
 

1976 births
Living people
Hungarian footballers
Fehérvár FC players
Gázszer FC footballers
Újpest FC players

Association football midfielders
Hungary international footballers
Hungary under-21 international footballers